Wellington House, also known as Charles Estabrook Mansion, is a historic home located at Fayetteville, Onondaga County, New York.  It was designed by Ward Wellington Ward built in 1922–1923.  The main house is a two-story, brick, stone, and half-timber Tudor Revival style mansion topped by a prominent slate roof.  It features a Tudor-arched front porch and stone portal.  In addition to the main house, the property includes the contributing gardener's residence; combined garage, stables, and greenhouse building; formal garden; brick gateway; two small utility buildings; and the original curving drive.

It was listed on the National Register of Historic Places in 1996.

References

External links

Houses on the National Register of Historic Places in New York (state)
Tudor Revival architecture in New York (state)
Houses completed in 1923
Houses in Onondaga County, New York
Manlius, New York
National Register of Historic Places in Onondaga County, New York